Pavlyna Shapovalenko (11 September 1949 – 27 April 2020) was a Ukrainian milk machine operator who worked in Tiachiv later the Sumy Raion. She worked on state farms during her life and worked to maximise productivity of the animals on the farm and collected a large amount of milk from cows. Shapovalenko received the government issued Order of the Red Banner of Labour in 1973, the Order of Lenin in 1977, and was made a Hero of Ukraine in 2001.

Biography
She graduated from the Vonigiv eight-year school in 1964. According to her, she became interested in science after reading about record-setting milkmaid Maria Savchenko in a newspaper. Spahovalenko began working at the state farm called Ilyich's Testament as a milkmaid when she was fourteen years old. During this time, she became well-known in the local area and achieved the record of becoming the first milkmaid to extract  of milk from a single cow per year. Shapovalenko would later work on the Verkhovyna state farm in the Vonihiv branch between 1966 and 1969.

Shapovalenko had planned to live in the village on a seasonal basis but she remained there for the rest of her life. She was employed as a milking machine operator on the dairy farm of the collective farm called "May Day" (today the agricultural production cooperative "Agrofirm" May Day). Shapovalenko assisted in helping the farm to raise heifers for the group she worked with and was able to milk a firstborn. She worked to maximise the productivity of the animals on the farm. She was one of the first people in the Sumy Raion to collect  then  of milk from cows annually. In 1973, Shapovlaneko received the government issued Order of the Red Banner of Labour and the Order of Lenin four years later. Shapovlaneko was made a Hero of Ukraine by president Leonid Kuchma in November 2001 "For many years of selfless work in agriculture,
the achievement of the highest rates in the region on milk yield".

On three occasions, she was elected to serve as a deputy on the regional council. Upon her retiring, Shapovlaneko opened a school for milkmaids, and attracts breeders from not just the Sumy Raion but also from other neighbouring districts and obalsts. She was the organiser and honorary president of a club called six thousand. She was married to the animal husbandry worker Mikhail Ivanovich, with whom she had two children. Shapovalenko died on 27 April 2020 and was buried in the village of Velyki Vilmy.

References

1949 births
2020 deaths
People from Zakarpattia Oblast
20th-century Ukrainian women
21st-century Ukrainian women
Ukrainian farmers
Ukrainian women farmers
Recipients of the Order of Lenin
Recipients of the Order of the Red Banner of Labour
Recipients of the title of Hero of Ukraine